River's End is a 1940 American Western film directed by Ray Enright and starring Dennis Morgan, Elizabeth Inglis and George Tobias. It is an adaptation of the 1919 novel The River's End by James Oliver Curwood which had previously been made into 1920 and 1930 films. It is also known by the alternative title of Double Identity.

The film is a Northern in which a Royal Canadian Mounted Police officer tracks an escaped convict, only to subsequently try to clear his name.

The film's sets were designed by the art director Esdras Hartley.

Plot summary

Main cast
 Dennis Morgan as John Keith/Sgt. Derry Conniston  
 Elizabeth Inglis as Linda Conniston  
 George Tobias as Andrew (Andy) Dijon  
 Victor Jory as Norman Talbot  
 James Stephenson as Insp. McDowell  
 Steffi Duna as Cheeta 
 Edward Pawley as Frank Crandell  
 John Ridgely as Constable Jeffers 
 Frank Wilcox as Constable Kentish  
 David Bruce as Balt  
 Gilbert Emery as Justice  
 Stuart Robertson as Sgt. Cruze

References

Bibliography
 Pitts, Michael R. Western Movies: A Guide to 5,105 Feature Films. McFarland, 2012.

External links
 
 
 
 

1940 films
1940s English-language films
Films directed by Ray Enright
Northern (genre) films
Films based on American novels
Remakes of American films
American Western (genre) films
1940 Western (genre) films
American black-and-white films
Royal Canadian Mounted Police in fiction
Films based on novels by James Oliver Curwood
Warner Bros. films
1940s American films